The 1947 Louisville Cardinals football team represented the University of Louisville in the Kentucky Intercollegiate Athletic Conference (KIAC) during the 1947 college football season. In their second season under head coach Frank Camp, the Cardinals compiled a 7–0–1 record (2–0 against conference opponents), won the KIAC championship, and outscored opponents by a combined total of 193 to 63.

Schedule

References

Louisville
Louisville Cardinals football seasons
College football undefeated seasons
Louisville Cardinals football